Simona Halep was the defending champion, having won the previous edition in 2013, but chose not to participate.

Yulia Putintseva won the title, defeating Anhelina Kalinina in the final, 6–4, 6–0.

Seeds

Draw

Finals

Top half

Bottom half

Qualifying

Seeds

Qualifiers

Lucky loser

Draw

First qualifier

Second qualifier

Third qualifier

Fourth qualifier

Fifth qualifier

Sixth qualifier

References

Main Draw
Qualifying Draw

Budapest Grand Prix - Singles
2021 Singles